Lubazodone (developmental code names YM-992, YM-35995) is an experimental antidepressant which was under development by Yamanouchi for the treatment for major depressive disorder in the late 1990s and early 2000s but was never marketed. It acts as a serotonin reuptake inhibitor (Ki for  = 21 nM) and 5-HT2A receptor antagonist (Ki = 86 nM), and hence has the profile of a serotonin antagonist and reuptake inhibitor (SARI). The drug has good selectivity against a range of other monoamine receptors, with its next highest affinities being for the α1-adrenergic receptor (Ki = 200 nM) and the 5-HT2C receptor (Ki = 680 nM). Lubazodone is structurally related to trazodone and nefazodone, but is a stronger serotonin reuptake inhibitor and weaker as a 5-HT2A receptor antagonist in comparison to them and is more balanced in its actions as a SARI. It reached phase II clinical trials for depression, but development was discontinued in 2001 reportedly due to the "erosion of the  market in the United States".

Synthesis

Thus reaction of 7-fluoro-4-indanol [161178-24-1] (1) with (S)-glycidyl methanesulfonate, CID:12461090 (2) in the presence of base leads to the epoxypropyl ether, CID:139677486 (3). Treatment with aminoethyl sulfate [926-39-6] (4) closes the morpholine ring giving Lubazodone (5).

References

External links
 Lubazodone - AdisInsight

5-HT2A antagonists
Alpha-1 blockers
Antidepressants
Indanes
Morpholines
Organofluorides
Phenol ethers
Serotonin reuptake inhibitors